The 2009 Kent State Golden Flashes football team represented Kent State University during the 2009 NCAA Division I FBS football season.  Kent State competed as a member of the Mid-American Conference (MAC) East Division.  The team was coached by Doug Martin and played their homes game at Dix Stadium. The team finished with a record of 5–7 (4–4 MAC).

Before the season

Recruiting

Schedule

Roster

Coaching staff

Game summaries

Coastal Carolina

Scoring Summary

1st Quarter
 04:36 KENT Hogan Safety 2-0 KENT

2nd Quarter

3rd Quarter
 07:49 KENT Flowers 5-yard run (Cortez kick) 9-0 KENT

4th Quarter
 11:57 KENT Jarvis 4-yard run (Cortez kick) 16-0 KENT
 03:42 KENT Team Safety 18-0 KENT

Boston College

Iowa State

Scoring Summary

1st Quarter
 11:56 ISU Mahoney 20-yard field goal 3-0 ISU
 08:45 KENT Archer 44-yard pass from Keith (Cortez kick) 3-7 KENT
 04:57 ISU Williams 22-yard pass from Arnaud (Mahoney kick) 10-7 ISU
 02:52 ISU Arnaud 9-yard run (Mahoney kick) 17-7 ISU

2nd Quarter
 12:42 ISU Arnaud 3-yard run (Mahoney kick) 24-7 ISU
 01:49 ISU Mahoney 37-yard field goal 27-7 ISU

3rd Quarter
 10:10 ISU Robinson 15-yard run (Mahoney kick) 34-7 ISU

4th Quarter
 06:43 KENT McBryde 8-yard pass from Keith (Cortez kick) 34-14 ISU

Miami (OH)

Scoring Summary

1st Quarter
 4:48 MIAMI Cook 28-yard field goal 3-0 MIAMI
 4:34 KENT Bowman 92-yard kickoff return (Cortez kick failed) 3-6 KENT

2nd Quarter
 13:18 KENT Archer 28-yard run (Cortez kick) 3-13 KENT
 7:49 KENT Cortez 37-yard field goal 3-16 KENT
 2:35 KENT Cortez 42-yard field goal 3-19 KENT
 0:04 MIAMI Rogers 9-yard pass from Dysert (Cook kick) 10-19 KENT

3rd Quarter
 5:54 KENT Konz 56-yard pass from Keith (Cortez kick) 10-26 KENT
 2:52 MIAMI Merriweather 1-yard run (Dysert pass failed) 16-26 KENT

4th Quarter
 1:19 Cortez 34-yard field goal 19-26 KENT

Baylor

Bowling Green

Scoring Summary

1st Quarter
 13:12 KENT Kirkland 86-yard run (Cortez kick) 0-7 KENT
 03:12 KENT Rainey 82-yard blocked field goal return (Cortez kick) 0-14 KENT

2nd Quarter
 12:14 BGSU Hodges 11-yard pass from Sheehan (Norsic kick) 7-12 KENT
 07:10 BGSU Barnes 8-yard pass from Sheehan (Norsic kick) 14-14
 01:45 BGSU Norsic 21-yard field goal 17-14 BGSU

3rd Quarter
 10:58 KENT Archer 3-yard pass from Keith (Cortez kick) 17-21 KENT
 03:44 KENT Terry 12-yard run (Cortez kick) 17-28 KENT

4th Quarter
 13:37 BGSU Barnes 2-yard pass from Sheehan (Sheehan pass failed) 23-28 KENT
 12:08 KENT Terry 3-yard run (Cortez kick) 23-35 KENT
 04:29 BGSU Barnes 45-yard pass from Sheehan (Norsic kick) 30-35 KENT
 00:05 BGSU Sheehan 9-yard run (Sheehan rush failed) 36-35 BGSU

Eastern Michigan

Ohio

Scoring Summary

1st Quarter
 7:40 OHIO Weller 22-yard field goal 0-3 OHIO

2nd Quarter
 4:44 KENT Cortez 30-yard field goal 3-3

3rd Quarter
 5:14 KENT Cortez 26-yard field goal 6-3 KENT

4th Quarter
 10:14 KENT Goode 3-yard pass from Keith (Cortez kick) 13-3 KENT
 7:02 KENT Goode 15-yard pass from Keith (Cortez kick) 20-3 KENT
 2:18 OHIO Brazill 87-yard punt return (Caldwell pass from Jones) 20-11 KENT

Western Michigan

Scoring Summary

1st quarter
 8:57 KENT Cortez 24-yard field goal 0-3 KENT

2nd Quarter
 11:22 WMU Ponder 2-yard pass from Hiller (Potter kick) 7-3 WMU
 8:17 KENT Cortez 39-yard field goal 7-6 WMU
 2:36 KENT Goode 34-yard pass from Spencer (Cortez kick) 7-13 KENT

3rd Quarter
 12:01 KENT Goode 19-yard pass from Keith (Cortez kick) 7-20 KENT

4th Quarter
 8:31 WMU Arnheim 9-yard pass from Hiller (Potter kick) 14-20 KENT
 5:35 KENT Terry 15-yard run (Keith pass failed) 14-26 KENT

Akron

Temple

Buffalo

References

Kent State
Kent State Golden Flashes football seasons
Kent State Golden Flashes football